Dr. Denis Yip is the Chief Executive Officer (CEO) of the Hong Kong Applied Science and Technology Research Institute (ASTRI).

Early life and Education 
Yip earned a BS in electrical engineering and computer science from the University of California at Berkeley and a MS in the same field in 1991. He later went on to earn an MBA from Golden Gate University.

Career
From 1991 to 2006, Dr Yip held a variety of senior management positions in the International Business Machines Corporation (IBM), including Vice President of the Asia Pacific Storage Division.

He had been the Senior Vice President and the President of Greater China of EMC Corporation since July 2006, and the Senior Vice President and President of Greater China of Dell Technologies Inc. since 2016.

From 2017 to early 2019, Dr Yip served as President and Director of the Digital China Holdings Company and the Fujian Start Group respectively.

He served as the Commissioner for Belt and Road of the Commerce and Economic Development Bureau, Hong Kong SAR government, since June 2019.

In October of 2021, Yip was named Chief Executive Officer (CEO) of ASTRI.

References

Hong Kong business executives
Year of birth missing (living people)
Living people